Bojangles Coliseum (originally Charlotte Coliseum and formerly Independence Arena and Cricket Arena) is an 8,600-seat multi-purpose arena located in Charlotte, North Carolina. It is operated by the Charlotte Regional Visitors Authority, which also oversees nearby Ovens Auditorium and the uptown Charlotte Convention Center. The naming-rights sponsor is the Bojangles restaurant chain. The building's signature domed roof is made of tin instead of steel or iron. The dome spans 332 feet in diameter and rises to 112 feet tall.

History

Early years (1955–1988)
Construction began on the Coliseum in 1953 after some delays. Arthur G. Odell Jr., of A. G. Odell Jr. & Associates. served as project designer, his first major project. James C. Hemphill, Jr. oversaw the project. Another important Charlotte figure of the time, Frederick Thompson of FN Thompson Construction, had the daunting, yet, highly successful task building the coliseum. In September 1955 the building was opened and dedicated by Billy Graham as the Charlotte Coliseum. At the time, it was the largest unsupported dome in the world and notably was the first free-spanning dome in the United States. Numerous newspapers and architectural magazines ran stories about the building over the following years, especially its dome. Total evacuation time for the entire structure was just four minutes, while seating capacity could be anywhere between 10,000 and 14,000 seats, approximately, depending on the event.

The Coliseum hosted numerous acts and events over its first few decades. A Billy Graham Crusade took place at the Coliseum in 1958. Elvis Presley had his first performance at the Coliseum in 1956 and his final one in 1977, being one of numerous musical acts to perform at the Coliseum during this time. In 1958, a massive storm went through the region, damaging the Coliseum's roof. However, the roof held up despite the damage. In 1970, a new north entrance was added. Due to its location, visitors walked onto the building's upper concourse after purchasing their tickets. This entrance is still used today.

Refurbishment and reopening (1988–2001)
After the new Charlotte Coliseum opened in 1988, the original Coliseum was shuttered since the new building effectively took over all the original Coliseum's duties. However, people soon realized the original Coliseum was nowhere near the end of its useful life. Over the next five years, an extensive refurbishment was made to the structure. This included technology, infrastructure, and accessibility upgrades.

Once reopened in 1993, it was considered as an alternative to the larger Coliseum for events that required less seating or overall space. An expansion franchise in the East Coast Hockey League, the Charlotte Checkers (named in honor of the original Checkers team that played at the Coliseum from 1956 to 1977), became the building's primary tenant. It also got its first name change that same year to Independence Arena. Color TVs were installed inside the concourse and a small restaurant opened for select fans in 1995. In 2001, the arena was renamed Cricket Arena in a naming rights arrangement with Cricket Communications.

The Lost Decade (2005–2015)

In 2005, the Checkers departed Cricket Arena for the newly opened Spectrum Center (then known as Charlotte Bobcats Arena, but it would change to Time Warner Cable Arena). Due to this, the Coliseum was left without a permanent tenant for a decade. The building remained open as a venue for medium-sized concerts and stage shows which would not be suitable for the Spectrum, as well as high school and some college sporting events, along with local attractions. In 2008, Bojangles Restaurants, Inc., based in Charlotte, bought the naming rights.

Questions about the building's future would arise in the years that followed, due to its age and lack of events. In 2012, the city of Charlotte began considering renovating the building itself as a multi-use sports complex. Two years later, another plan was announced with developer GoodSports that would add both a hotel and sports complex next to the Coliseum. Both plans ultimately fell through.

Upgraded for a new age (2015–present)
In November 2014, the arena got a permanent tenant once again when a third Checkers franchise, now in the American Hockey League, announced a tentative agreement with the Charlotte Regional Visitors' Authority to return to Bojangles' Coliseum for the 2015–16 season.  The Spectrum had poor sight lines for hockey. This franchise had taken the place of the ECHL Checkers four years earlier. The agreement was pending a Charlotte City Council vote to approve $16 million in funding for renovations in conjunction with the Checkers' return and that December, the city approved the $16 million needed. The renovations would include many modern amenities. This would be the Coliseum's first major renovation since the 1988 refurbishment.
 
Almost a year to the day when the Checkers announced their return to the Coliseum the renovations were completed and unveiled to the public. Aside from the new seats and score/video boards, other additions also included a sound system (replacing the one used since 1955), locker rooms, a restaurant, updated concessions and repainting the interior.

The Coliseum celebrated its 60th anniversary in 2015. Additional renovations were made in 2016, including upgraded heating/cooling, new internal lighting, and replacing the ice floor among other improvements. In 2018, the city of Charlotte broke ground on a structure to connect the Coliseum to Ovens Auditorium, which was completed in 2020.

Sports

Basketball
During its days as the Charlotte Coliseum, the arena was one of the homes for the Carolina Cougars of the American Basketball Association from 1969 to 1974. The Cougars became tenants after the Houston Mavericks moved to North Carolina in 1969. The Cougars were a "regional franchise," playing home games in Charlotte (Charlotte Coliseum), Greensboro (Greensboro Coliseum), Winston-Salem Memorial Coliseum and Raleigh (Dorton Arena). Hall of Fame coach Larry Brown began his coaching career with the Cougars in 1972. Billy Cunningham was the ABA MVP for the Cougars in the 1972–73 season. Despite a strong fan base, the Cougars were sold and moved to St. Louis in 1974.

The arena hosted the ACC men's basketball tournament from 1968 to 1970, the Southern Conference men's basketball tournament from 1964 to 1971 (and again in 2010 for the tournament's first three days), and was the site of the Sun Belt Conference men's basketball tournament from 1977 to 1980. Overall, the Coliseum has held no fewer than 15 tournaments between the three conferences and has also hosted 13 NCAA Tournaments. The Coliseum hosted the Charlotte 49ers basketball teams from 1976 to 1988, and again from 1993 to 1996. In 2017, the first two rounds of the CIAA men's and women's basketball tournaments were played at the Coliseum. This marked the 29th college tournament played at the building. In 2022, the Coliseum hosted the Big South Conference men's and women's basketball tournaments, which it hosted again in 2023.

Hockey

Before the third iteration of the Checkers (AHL) returned in 2015, Bojangles' was the home of minor league hockey for many years prior. The first instance started in 1956, when the Baltimore Clippers moved to Charlotte to become the first iteration of the Checkers. The building hosted its first hockey match in January 1956 before a sold-out crowd of over 10,000. The club lasted until 1977, when they folded. In 1993, the ECHL version of the Checkers started and won a championship in 1996. The second iteration of the Checkers played at the Coliseum until 2005, with the franchise surrendering its licence to the ECHL when the Carolina Hurricanes moved their AHL franchise from Albany (NY) in 2010, creating the third iteration. The Coliseum would have been available to host playoff games in either the ECHL or AHL during the following decade (due to possible scheduling conflicts with Spectrum), but this never occurred as the Bobcats (as the NBA team was called) never made the playoffs during the time (the current Charlotte NBA franchise, which began in 2004, has never won a playoff series).

Notable games
On January 17, 2018, the Coliseum was in the media spotlight when the Checkers hosted the Bridgeport Sound Tigers in an empty arena. With winter weather blanketing Charlotte, the team warned fans to stay away and the game went on as scheduled.
Bojangles Coliseum was the site of the longest game in American Hockey League history on May 10, 2018. The Checkers lost to the Lehigh Valley Phantoms 2–1 in five overtimes.

Other sports
The Carolina Speed of the American Indoor Football Association, formerly playing at the Cabarrus Arena & Events Center, moved to the Coliseum in 2009. After the season, they announced they would be sitting out the 2010 season and resuming play in 2011 back in Cabarrus. They returned in 2011 to the Coliseum, this time as a member of the Southern Indoor Football League, and remained until 2013.

The arena also hosted the worst team in MILL history, the 1996 Charlotte Cobras (0–10). The 1996 season was their one and only in the MILL and the team folded without ever winning a game. In 2012, the arena was home to the Charlotte Copperheads of the now defunct Professional Lacrosse League.

An indoor soccer team, the Carolina Vipers, played their one and only season in the CISL in summer 1994. The team went 3–25 and then went "inactive" for 1995, never to return. The Vipers averaged 3,034 fans per game in their one season.

The Coliseum hosted both NWA Wrestling and Mid-Atlantic Championship Wrestling from the 1970s to the 1990s. WCW also held numerous wrestling events there, including the tenth anniversary of Starrcade, the company's premier event of the year, and the 1997 Slamboree. Additionally, the building hosted UFC Fight Night: Florian vs. Gomi on March 31, 2010. All Elite Wrestling aired an episode of AEW Dynamite that was broadcast live from the venue on November 6, 2019. AEW also held Fight for the Fallen on July 28, 2021, and Battle of the Belts on January 8, 2022, at the venue.

The Charlotte Roller Girls roller derby league played their home bouts at the arena from 2008 to 2009 before moving to the Grady Cole Center.

Concerts and other events
Bojangles' Coliseum has been the site for numerous concerts, shows, and various events throughout its lifespan. 
It has been the site for the Spring Commencement ceremonies of Johnson C. Smith University (JCSU) for several years. JCSU uses the Coliseum because it offers more seating and parking capacity than their own on-campus facilities. The Coliseum also hosted the graduation ceremony for the Charlotte campus of the University of Phoenix. In addition, the UNC-Charlotte, Central Piedmont Community College and many local high schools have held and currently hold graduation ceremonies at the building. The Mecklenburg County Public Health Department utilized the Coliseum complex, otherwise unused during the COVID-19 pandemic, as its primary mass vaccination site.

References

External links
Bojangles' Coliseum Website

–

1955 establishments in North Carolina
American Basketball Association venues
American Basketball Association (2000–present) venues
Basketball venues in North Carolina
Carolina Cougars
Charlotte 49ers basketball venues
Charlotte Checkers
College basketball venues in the United States
Indoor ice hockey venues in the United States
Indoor lacrosse venues in the United States
Indoor soccer venues in the United States
Sports venues in Charlotte, North Carolina
University of North Carolina at Charlotte
Sports venues completed in 1955
Indoor arenas in North Carolina